Lummi (Xwlemi Chosen) is a dialect of the North Straits Salish language traditionally spoken by the Lummi people of northwest Washington, in the United States. Although traditionally referred to as a language, it is mutually intelligible with the other dialects of North Straits.

Lummi language is still spoken on the Lummi reservation and is taught at Ferndale High School, Lummi Nation School, Vista Middle School, Horizon Middle School, Skyline and Eagleridge Elementary Schools, and the Northwest Indian College.

Phonology 

  phonemically occurs only rarely within vocabulary.

References

Further reading
 Available online through the Washington State Library's Classics in Washington History collection or at Internet Archive

North Straits Salish languages
Indigenous languages of the Pacific Northwest Coast
Indigenous languages of Washington (state)